The Indian general election, 2004 in Maharashtra were held for 48 seats with the state going to polls in the first three phases of the general elections. The major contenders in the state where the United Progressive Alliance (UPA) and National Democratic Alliance (NDA). UPA consisted of the Indian National Congress and the Nationalist Congress Party whereas the NDA consisted of the Bharatiya Janata Party and the Shiv Sena.

Results

Source: Election Commission of India

Results by Alliance

List of Elected MPs:

Region-wise Breakup

References

Indian general elections in Maharashtra
2000s in Maharashtra
Maharashtra